
This is a list of aircraft in alphabetical order beginning with 'C' through to 'Cc'.

C–Cc

C-E 
(C-E Aeroplane Works, (office) New York, NY; (plant) Anderson, IN)
 C-E A-12 Transcontinental Triplane
 E-C-13 1916 Triplane Tractor

CAARP
(Cooperative des Ateliers Aeronautiques de la Region Parisienne – Parisian aeronautic factory co-operative)
 CAARP CP-100
 CAARP CAP-20 (Mudry CAP 20)

CAB
(Cantieri Aeronautici Bergamaschi )
see:Caproni-Bergamaschi

CAB
(Constructions Aéronautiques du Béarn – Béarn aeronautic manufacturers)
 CAB GY-20 Minicab
 CAB GY-30 Supercab

Cabane-Saissac 
(Henri Saissac)
 Cabane-Saissac CS-01-3

Cabin-Aire 
 OHS-3
(also displayed and registered as  "Snyder OHS-III", "deLloyd Monoplane" and "Aire-Craft Cabin-Aire/deLloyd"

Cabrinha 
(Richard Cabrinha)
 Cabrinha RC-412 Free Spirit (Mk II)

CAC 
(Commonwealth Aircraft Corporation)
 CAC Wirraway
 CAC Wackett
 CAC Boomerang
 CAC Mustang
 CAC Kangaroo
 CAC Ceres
 CAC Winjeel
 CAC Avon-Sabre
 CAC Macchi
 CAC Kiowa

CAC 
(Commuter Aircraft Corporation)
 CAC-100

CACT
(Compañía Aérea de Construcción y Transportes / Waterhouse / BAJA California / Tijuana)
 CACT BAJA California BC.1
 CACT BAJA California BC.2
 CACT BAJA California BC.3

Cadet 
(Cadet Aircraft Co, Pomona, CA)
 Cadet 2-P-A (Chambers Trainer q.v.)

Cadillac 
(Cadillac Aircraft Corp/H.G. McCarroll - Detroit, MI)
 McCarroll Voyageur
 McCarroll Duoplane

CAG
(Construcciones Aeronauticas de Galicia, Spain)
 CAG Toxo

Cage 
(John M. Cage - Denver, CO)
 Cage 1909 Tilt-rotor (c. 1909)

Cagny 
(Raymond Cagny - France)
 Cagney Performance 2000 (c. 1909)

CAHI
(anglicised version of TsAGI Центра́льный аэрогидродинами́ческий институ́т (ЦАГИ) or Tsentralniy Aerogidrodinamicheskiy Institut, the Central Aerohydrodynamic Institute)
see:TsAGI

Cailly 
(France)
 Cailly 1911 Type Millitaire

Cain 
(Cain Aircraft Corp - Detroit, MI)
 Cain Sport

CAIC 
(Changhe Aircraft Industries Corporation)
 Changhe Z-8
 Changhe WZ-10 (WZ – Wuzhuang Zhishengji – armed helicopter)
 Changhe Z-11

CAIG 
(China Aviation Industry General)
 China Aviation Industry General Aircraft Primus 150

Cain 
(Cain Aircraft Corp, 10527 Gratiot Ave, Detroit, MI)
 Cain Sport CC-14

Cairns 
((Edmund B) Cairns Aircraft Corp, 62 Rubber Ave, Naugatuck, CT)
 Cairns A (based on the Clark Robinson Special)
 Cairns AG-4 (based on the Clark Robinson Special)
 Cairns AC-6
 Cairns OG
 Cairns B
 Cairns C

C.A.L. 
(Columbia Air Liners, Inc., New York, NY)
 C.A.L. Mailplane "Uncle Sam" (1929)
 C.A.L. CAL-1 Triad
 C.A.L. CAL-2 (5 Place Amphibian)

Calderara 
(Italy)
 Calderara 1912 Hydroaeroplane

Caldas Aeronautica
(Pali, Colombia)
 Caldas 2G7 Vento

Calidus
(Calidus Technology Development and Manufacturing Company, UAE)
 Calidus B-250

California 
(USA)
 California Aero Glider "Skyway Express"

California 
(California Aircraft Corp, Los Angeles, CA)
 California Cub D-1
 California Cub D-2

California 
(John J Montijo & Lloyd Royer, Glendale, CA)
 California Coupe-Cabin

California Aero 
(California Aero Mfg & Supply Co (Fdr: Cleve F Shaffer), San Francisco, CA)
 California Aero 1910 Biplane

California Cub 
(California Aircraft Corp, 5866 South San Pedro St, Los Angeles, CA)
 California Cub D-1-K
 California Cub D-2

California Institute of Technology 
(Pasadena, CA)
 California Institute of Technology Merrill Type Stagger-Decalage

Calipt'Air
(Spiez, Switzerland)
Calipt'Air Serenis
Calipt'Air V-56
Calipt'Air Vectis
Calipt'Air Walabis Bi

Call 
((a.k.a.Girard) Aerial Navigation Co of America Inc (Fdr: Henry Laurens Call), Girard, KS)
 Call Mayfly 1909
 Call Whynot
 Call II monoplane

CallAir 
((Ivan, Ruell T, Spencer) Call Aircraft Co, Afton, WY)
 CallAir S-1
 CallAir A
 CallAir A-1
 CallAir A-2
 CallAir A-3
 CallAir A-4
 CallAir A-5
 CallAir A-6
 CallAir A-7
 CallAir A-9
 CallAir B-1
 Call-Air Super Cadet

Calumet
(Calumet Motorsports)
 Calumet Snobird Explorer

Calvel 
(Jacques Calvel)
 Calvel Frelon

Calvignac 
(France)
 Calvinac 19123 Monoplane

Camair
( Camair Aircraft Corp, Remsenburg, NY)
 Camair Twin Navion

Camal 
(Victor Camal, France)
 Camal 1911 Flying Machine (Patent)

Cambier
(Albert Cambier)
 Cambier AC1

Camco 
(Chicago Aircraft Mfg Corp, 6116 St Lawrence Ave, Chicago, IL)
 Camco 2

CAMCO 
(Central Aircraft Manufacturing Company Inc.)
 CAMCO V-Liner

Cameron & Sons Aircraft
 Cameron P-51G

Cammacorp 
(El Segundo, CA)
 Cammacorp DC-8 Super 71

Campbell 
(Corwin B Campbell, Evanston, IL)
 Campbell CB

Campbell 
(John M Campbell, Tacoma, WA)
 Campbell Porpoise

Campbell 
((Hayden S) Campbell Aircraft Co)
 Campbell Model F

Campbell
(Campbell Aircraft)
 Campbell Cougar
 Campbell Cricket
 Campbell Curlew

Campbell & Bone 
(Mark M Campbell and R O Bone, Los Angeles, CA)
 Campbell Super Sport (Bone Golden Eagle C-5 prototypes)

Campini 
Data from:
 Caproni-Campini N.1
 Campini CS.3 
 Campini CS.4

CAMS 
(Chantiers Aéro-Maritimes de la Seine – Seine aero-maritime shipbuilders)
 CAMS C.9 (License-Built SIAI S.9)
 CAMS C.13 (License-Built SIAI S.13)
 CAMS 30
 CAMS 31
 CAMS 32
 CAMS 33
 CAMS 34
 CAMS 35
 CAMS 36
 CAMS 37
 CAMS 38
 CAMS 42 ET.2
 CAMS 46
 CAMS 50
 CAMS 51
 CAMS 52
 CAMS 53
 CAMS 54GR 
 CAMS 55
 CAMS 56
 CAMS 57
 CAMS 58
 CAMS 60
 CAMS 80
 CAMS 90
 CAMS 110
 CAMS 120

Canada Air RV
(Canada Air RV Inc, Edmonton, Alberta, Canada)
ARV Griffin

Canadair 
 Canadair C-4
 Canadair C-5
 Canadair CL-1 Canso
 Canadair CL-2 North Star
 Canadair CL-4 Argonaut
 Canadair CL-5
 Canadair CL-13 Sabre
 Canadair CL-21
 Canadair CL-28 Argus
 Canadair CL-30 Silver Star
 Canadair CL-41 Tutor
 Canadair CL-44 Yukon
 Canadair CL-66
 Canadair CL-84 Dynavert
 Canadair CL-89
 Canadair CL-90
 Canadair CL-201
 Canadair CL-215
 Canadair CL-219 Freedom Fighter
 Canadair CL-226 Freedom Fighter
 Canadair CL-227
 Canadair CL-289
 Canadair CL-415
 Canadair CL-540
 Canadair CL-600 Challenger
 Canadair CL-601 Challenger
 Canadair CL-604 Challenger
 Canadair CL-605 Challenger
 Canadair CL-610 Challenger E
 Canadair Regional Jet CRJ100
 Canadair Regional Jet CRJ200

Canadair aircraft Canadian military designations
(all manufacturers - see List of aircraft of Canada's air forces)
Data from:
 Bombardier CC-144 Challenger
 Canadair CX-84 Dynavert
 Canadair CF-104 Starfighter
 Canadair CC-106 Yukon
 Canadair CP-107 Argus
 Canadair CP-108 Caribou
 Canadair CC-109 Cosmopolitan
 Canadair CF-111 Starfighter
 Canadair CT-114 Tutor
 Canadair CF-116
 Canadair CX-131
 Canadair CT-133 Silver Star 3
 Canadair CE-144A
 Canadair CC-144
 Canadair CP-144
 Canadair CX-144
 Canadair CF-5D

Canadian Aerodrome Company 
 Hubbard 1910 monoplane
 Baddeck No. 1
 Baddeck No. 2

Canadian Aeroplanes 
(Canadian Aeroplanes Ltd., Canada)
 Canadian Aeroplanes F-5L

Canadian Car and Foundry 
 Burnelli CBY-3
 Gregor FDB-1
 CC&F F.A.T. 2 Maple Leaf
 CC&F SBW Helldiver

Canadian Home Rotors 
 Canadian Home Rotors Safari
 Canadian Home Rotors Baby Belle

Canadian
(Canadian Powered Parachutes, Vegreville, Alberta, Canada)
Canadian Phase I

Canadian military aircraft designations
(all manufacturers) - see List of aircraft of Canada's air forces

Canadian Vickers 
 Canadian Vickers Vancouver
 Canadian Vickers Vanessa
 Canadian Vickers Varuna
 Canadian Vickers Vedette
 Canadian Vickers Velos
 Canadian Vickers Vigil
 Canadian Vickers Vista

Canadian Wooden Aircraft 
(Canadian Wooden Aircraft Co., Canada)
 Canadian Wooden Aircraft Robin

Canaero Dynamics 
 Canaero Dynamics Toucan series II

CanAmerican 
(CanAmerican Inc)
 CanAmerican S.G.VI

Canard Aviation 
see Aviafiber

Cañete 
(Captain of Engineers Antonio Cañete Heredia)
 Cañete Pirata (aka HACR for Hidro Antonio Cañete de Reconocimiento)

Cannon 
(Walter Cannon, Los Angeles, CA)
 Cannon 1911 biplane
 Cannon (1911 monoplane)

Canova 
 Canova 1950 all-wing

CANSA 
(Construzioni Aeronautiche Novaresi SA – Fiat)
 CANSA Lictor 90
 CANSA Lictor 130
 CANSA C.4
 CANSA C.5
 CANSA C.6 Falchetto
 CANSA FC.11 (trainer project)
 CANSA FC.12
 CANSA FC.20
 CANSA CT.24 (Assault glider - 2 ordered but not built)

CANT 
(sometimes labelled 'C.R.D.A. CANT')
(CANT – Cantieri Aeronautici e Navali Triestini – Trieste shipbuilding and naval aeronautics)
(Part of C.R.D.A. – Cantieri Riuniti dell'Adriatico – re-united Adriatic shipbuilding)
 CNT-II
 CANT 6
 CANT 7
 CANT 10
 CANT 13
 CANT 18
 CANT 21
 CANT 22
 CANT 23
 CANT 25
 CANT 26
 CANT 27
 CANT 36
 CANT 38
 CANT Z.501
 CANT Z.504
 CANT Z.505
 CANT Z.506
 CANT Z.508
 CANT Z.509
 CANT Z.511
 CANT Z.515
 CANT Z.516
 CANT Z.1007
 CANT Z.1010
 CANT Z.1011
 CANT Z.1012
 CANT Z.1015
 CANT Z.1018

Cantinieau
(Jean Cantinieau)
 Cantinieau C-100

Canton
 Canton S2 (STAe specification 1918 S2 - armoured ground attack aircraft)

Canton et Unné
(Georges Canton et Georges Unné)
 Canton et Unné 1910 monoplane

Canton-Melcher 
(Allen Canton & J Melcher, Bronx, NY)
 Canton-Melcher Transatlantic

Canu 
(Lucien Canu)
 Canu 01

CAO 
(see SNCAO))

CAP
(Companhia Aeronáutica Paulista)
 CAP Alcatraz
 CAP-1 Planalto (IPT-4 Planalto)
 CAP-3 Planalto (IPT-4 Planalto)
 CAP-4 Paulistinha
 CAP-5 Carioquinha
 CAP-6 Tufão
 CAP-7
 CAP-8 
 CAP-9 Carioca

CAP Aviation
 CAP Aviation CAP-10
 CAP Aviation CAP-20
 CAP Aviation CAP-21
 CAP Aviation CAP-222
 CAP Aviation CAP-230
 CAP Aviation CAP-231
 CAP Aviation CAP-232

Capelis 
(Safety Airplane Corp, Oakland Airport and El Cerrito, CA)
 Capelis XC-12

Capella 
(Capella Aircraft Corporation, Austin, TX)
 Capella SS
 Capella XS
 Capella XLS
 Capella XLS Super 100
 Capella Flashback
 Capella Javelin

Capen 
((Ernest J) Capen Aircraft Corp, Lincoln, NE)
 Capen Parasol
 Capen Skyway aka Special

Capital 
(Capital Machinery Factory)
 Capital-1<ref name=Gordonchina>{{cite book|last=Gordon|first=Yefim|title=Chinese Aircraft:Chinas aviation industry since 1951|year=2008|publisher=Hikoki Publications|location=Manchester|isbn=9-781902-109046|author2=Dmitry Komissarov}}</ref>

 Capital Air 
(Capital Aircraft Co Inc, Lansing, MI, 1929: Relocated and renamed Royal Aircraft Corp, Royal Oak, MI (qv))
 Capital Air Trainer

Capital
(Capital Helicopter Corporation)
 Capital C-1 Hoppi-copter

 CAPRA 
( Compagnie Anonyme de Productions et Réalisations Aéronautiques (CAPRA)) – (Roger Aimé Robert, designer – Marcel Chassagny, manager)
 CAPRA R.10
 CAPRA RR.20
 CAPRA S.20
 CAPRA R.30
 CAPRA R.300
 CAPRA R.40
 CAPRA R.41
 CAPRA R.400
 CAPRA R.46
 CAPRA R.80
 CAPRA R.90

 Caproni Data from:Aeroplani Caproni
(Societa Italiana Caproni)
(see also: Caproni Bergamaschi, Caproni-Reggiane, Caproni Vizzola)

Pre-World War I
 Caproni Ca.1 of 1910 – Experimental biplane

World War I
 Caproni Ca.1 of 1914 – Heavy bomber
 Caproni Ca.2 – Heavy bomber
 Caproni Ca.3 – Heavy bomber
 Caproni Ca.4 – Heavy bomber
 Caproni Ca.5 – Heavy bomber
 Caproni Ca.14 - biplane
 Caproni Ca.15 - monoplane
 Caproni Ca.17 - monoplane
 Caproni Ca.18 – Observation plane
 Caproni Ca.19 - monoplane
 Caproni Ca.20 – Monoplane fighter
 Caproni Ca.21 - reconnaissance aircraft
 Caproni Ca.22 – Variable incidence research parasol monoplane
 Caproni Ca.26 - project
 Caproni Ca.27 - project
 Caproni Ca.28 - project
 Caproni Ca.29 - project
 Caproni Ca.31 – Modified Ca.1
 Caproni Ca.32 – Modified Italian Army version of Ca.1

Inter-war period
 Caproni Ca.30 – Postwar redesignation of 1914 Ca.1
 Caproni Ca.33 – Postwar redesignation of Ca.3
 Caproni Ca.34 – Postwar redesignation of proposed modified Ca.3
 Caproni Ca.35 – Postwar redesignation of proposed modified Ca.3
 Caproni Ca.36 – Postwar redesignation of modified Ca.3
 Caproni Ca.37 – Postwar redesignation of prototype ground-attack version of Ca.3
 Caproni Ca.39 – Postwar redesignation of proposed seaplane version of Ca.3
 Caproni Ca.40 – Postwar redesignation of Ca.4 prototype
 Caproni Ca.41 – Postwar redesignation of Ca.4 variant
 Caproni Ca.42 – Postwar redesignation of Ca.4 variant
 Caproni Ca.43 – Postwar redesignation of floatplane variant of Ca.4
 Caproni Ca.44 – Postwar redesignation of Ca.5 heavy bomber
 Caproni Ca.45 – Postwar redesignation of Ca.5 aircraft built for France
 Caproni Ca.46 – Postwar redesignation of Ca.5 variant
 Caproni Ca.47 – Postwar redesignation of seaplane version of Ca.5
 Caproni Ca.48 – Airliner version of Ca.4
 Caproni Ca.49 – Proposed seaplane airliner of 1919
 Caproni Ca.50 – Air ambulance version of Ca.44
 Caproni Ca.51 – Postwar redesignation of prototype of enlarged Ca.4
 Caproni Ca.52 – Postwar redesignation for Ca.4 aircraft built for Royal Naval Air Service
 Caproni Ca.56 – Airliner version of Ca.1
 Caproni Ca.57 – Airliner version of Ca.44
 Caproni Ca.58 – Postwar redesignation for re-engined Ca.4s
 Caproni Ca.59 – Postwar redesignation for exported Ca.58s
 Caproni Ca.60 Noviplano – Flying boat airliner prototype
 Caproni Ca.64 - fighter project
 Caproni Ca.65 - fighter project 
 Caproni Ca.66 - Four-engine, single-fuselage bomber of 1922
 Caproni Ca.68 - reconnaissance flying boat project 
 Caproni Ca.69 - reconnaissance flying boat project
 Caproni Ca.70 – Prototype night fighter of 1925
 Caproni Ca.71 – Ca.70 variant of 1927
 Caproni Ca.73 – Airliner and light bomber
 Caproni Ca.74 – Re-engined Ca.73 light bomber
 Caproni Ca.75 - biplane bomber project
 Caproni Ca.76 - biplane bomber project
 Caproni Ca.77 - biplane bomber project
 Caproni Ca.78 - biplane bomber project
 Caproni Ca.80 – Later redesignation of Ca.74
 Caproni Ca.81 - reconnaissance monoplane project
 Caproni Ca.82 – Redesignation of Ca.73ter variant
 Caproni Ca.83 - monoplane fighter
 Caproni Ca.84 - biplane flying boat project
 Caproni Ca.85 - biplane flying boat project
 Caproni Ca.86 - biplane flying boat project
 Caproni Ca.88 – Redesignation of Ca.73quarter variant
 Caproni Ca.89 – Redesignation of Ca.73quarterG variant
 Caproni Ca.90 – Heavy bomber aircraft
 Caproni Ca.92 - reconnaissance biplane project
 Caproni Ca.93 - biplane bomber project
 Caproni Ca.94 - 4-engine monoplane heavy bomber
 Caproni Ca.95 - Heavy bomber aircraft, 1933
 Caproni Ca.96 - 4-engine biplane heavy bomber project
 Caproni Ca.97 – Civil utility aircraft
 Caproni Ca.98 - monoplane tourer
 Caproni Ca.99 - biplane tourer
 Caproni Ca.100 – Trainer
 Caproni Ca.101 – Airliner, transport, and bomber
 Caproni Ca.102 – Re-engined Ca.101
 Caproni Ca.106 - civil biplane project
 Caproni Ca.107 - biplane fighter project
 Caproni Ca.108 - mailplane project
 Caproni Ca.109 - 2-seat biplane sport/trainer
 Caproni Ca.110 - biplane fighter project
 Caproni Ca.111 – Reconnaissance aircraft and light bomber
 Caproni Ca.113 – Advanced trainer
 Caproni Ca.114 – Biplane fighter
 Caproni Ca.115 - twin-engined sesquiplane bomber project
 Caproni Ca.116 - sports biplane project
 Caproni Ca.117 - experimental high-altitude monoplane project
 Caproni Ca.118 - twin-engine monoplane bomber project
 Caproni Ca.119 - reconnaissance biplane project
 Caproni Ca.121 - fast monoplane bomber project
 Caproni Ca.122 – Prototype bomber and transport
 Caproni Ca.123 – Proposed airliner version of Ca.122
 Caproni Ca.124 – Reconnaissance and bomber floatplane
 Caproni Ca.125 – Two-seat touring biplane
 Caproni Ca.126 - monoplane sports aircraft project
 Caproni Ca.128 - low-wing metal monoplane 1+4 feederliner project 
 Caproni Ca.129 - low-wing metal monoplane 1+4 feederliner project
 Caproni Ca.130 - trimotor transport, precursor of Caproni Ca.133
 Caproni Ca.132 – Prototype bomber and airliner
 Caproni Ca.134 – Reconnaissance biplane
 Caproni Ca.150 - twin-boom attack fighter
 Caproni Ca.153 - monoplane heavy fighter project
 Caproni Ca.154 - twin-engine monoplane heavy fighter project
 Caproni Ca.155 - twin-engine monoplane heavy fighter project
 Caproni Ca.156 - twin-engined heavy fighter project
 Caproni Ca.161 – High-altitude experimental aircraft
 Caproni Ca.162 - recce-fighter project
 Caproni Ca.163 – Prototype of Ca.164
 Caproni Ca.165 – Prototype fighter of 1938
 Caproni Ca.204 - long-range bomber project
 Caproni Ca.211 - three-engine long-range bomber project
 Caproni Ca.201 - high altitude bomber project
 Caproni Ca.205 - long-range bomber project
 Caproni Ca.214 - aerobatic trainer project
 Caproni Ca.301 – Prototype fighter
 Caproni A.P.1 – Attack aircraft derivative of Ca.301
 Caproni Ca.305 – First production version of A.P.1
 Caproni Ca.306 – Airliner prototype (1935)
 Caproni Ca.307 – Second production version of A.P.1
 Caproni Ca.308 – Export version of A.P.1 for El Salvador and Paraguay
 Caproni Ca. 308 Borea – Airliner
 Caproni Ca.309 – military light twin
 Caproni Ca.345 – recce floatplane project
 Caproni Ca.350 – Fighter-bomber, reconnaissance aircraft
 Caproni-Reggiane Ca.400 – Caproni-Reggiane-built version of Piaggio P.32 medium bomber
 Caproni Ca.401 – twin-engine recce-fighter
 Caproni Ca.405 – Caproni-built version of Piaggio P.32 medium bomber
 Caproni Ca.410 – twin-engined recce-bomber floatplane project
 Caproni CH.1 – Prototype fighter of 1935
 Caproni PS.1 – Sports aircraft
 Caproni Bergamaschi PL.3 – Long-distance racer aircraft
 Caproni-Pensuti triplane – Sports triplane of 1919
 Caproni Sauro-1 – Two-seat touring aircraft
 Caproni Vizzola F.5 – Fighter of 1939
 Stipa-Caproni – Experimental ducted-fan powered prototype of 1932

World War II
 Caproni Ca.133 – Transport and bomber
 Caproni Ca.135 – Medium bomber
 Caproni Ca.148 – Civil-military transport version of Ca.133
 Caproni Ca.164 – Trainer and liaison and reconnaissance aircraft
 Caproni Ca.309 Ghibli – Reconnaissance, ground-attack, and transport aircraft
 Caproni Ca.310 Libeccio – Reconnaissance aircraft and light bomber
 Caproni Ca.311 – Light bomber and reconnaissance aircraft
 Caproni Ca.312 – Re-engined version of Ca.310 sold to Norway
 Caproni Ca.313 – Reconnaissance bomber, trainer, and transport
 Caproni Ca.314 – Ground-attack aircraft and torpedo bomber
 Caproni Ca.316 – Seaplane
 Caproni Ca.320 - three-engine bomber
 Caproni Ca.325 – Proposed version of Ca.135 medium bomber with more powerful engines, built in mock-up form only
 Caproni Ca.330 - Project
 Caproni Ca.331 – Prototype tactical reconnaissance aircraft/light bomber (Ca.331 O.A./Ca.331A) of 1940 and prototype night fighter (Ca.331 C.N./Ca.331B) of 1942
 Caproni Ca.332 - Project; derived from Ca.330
 Caproni Ca.335 – Fighter-bomber, reconnaissance aircraft for the Belgian Air Force.
 Caproni Ca.360 - Twin engine dive bomber project
 Caproni Ca.365 - Twin engine bomber project
 Caproni Ca.370 - twin engine combat plane project
 Caproni Ca.375 - twin engine combat plane project
 Caproni Ca.380 - twin-boom fighter project
 Caproni Ca.381 - twin-boom fighter project
 Caproni Campini N.1 – Experimental motorjet-powered aircraft of 1940
 Caproni Campini Ca.183bis – Proposed high-altitude fighter aircraft
 Caproni Vizzola F.4 – Fighter prototype of 1940 with German-made engine
 Caproni Vizzola F.5bis – Proposed version of F.4 with Italian-made engine
 Caproni Vizzola F.6 – Fighter prototype of 1941 (F.6M) and 1943 (F.6Z)

Post-World War II
 Caproni Ca.193 – Twin-engined six-seat monoplane
 Caproni Ca.195 - jet trainer project
 Caproni Trento F-5 – Lightweight two-seat jet trainer
 Caproni Vizzola Calif – Family of gliders (sailplanes) (A-10, A-12, A-14, A-15, A-20, A-21)
 Caproni Vizzola C22 Ventura – Light jet trainer

Wartime Italian Army designations
Caproni Ca.1 (1914) Italian Army designation
Caproni Ca.30 (Ca.1 re-designated post-war)
Caproni Ca.31 (Ca.1 re-designated post-war)
Caproni Ca.32 (Ca.1 re-designated post-war)
Caproni Ca.260 (informal designation for initial Ca.1s with total 260hp)
Caproni Ca.300 (informal designation for Ca.1s powered by three 100hp engines)
Caproni Ca.2 (1916) Italian Army designation
Caproni Ca.350 (informal designation for Ca.2s powered by 2x100hp and 1x150hp engines)
Caproni Ca.3 (1916) Italian Army designation
Caproni Ca.450 (informal designation for Ca.3s powered by three 150hp engines)
Caproni Ca.4 (1916) Italian Army designation
Caproni Ca.5 (1917) Italian Army designation
Caproni Ca.600 (informal designation for Ca.5s powered by three 200hp engines)
Caproni Ca.750 (informal designation for Ca.5s powered by three 250hp engines)

Caproni designations
Caproni-Coanda 1908 glider
Caproni Ca.1 (1910) biplane
Caproni Ca.2 (1910) biplane
Caproni Ca.3 (1911) biplane
Caproni Ca.4 
Caproni Ca.5 (1911) biplane
Caproni Ca.6 (1911) biplane
Caproni Ca.7
25hp Caproni monoplane (Cm 1)
Caproni Ca.8 (1911) monoplane (25hp Caproni monoplane / Cm 1)
Caproni Ca.9
Caproni Ca.10
Caproni Ca.11 (1912) monoplane (Cm 5)
Caproni Ca.12 (1912) monoplane (Cm 6)
Caproni Ca.13 (1912) monoplane (Cm 7)
Caproni Ca.14 (1912) monoplane (Cm 9)
Caproni Ca.15
Caproni Ca.16 (1912) monoplane (Cm 12)
Caproni Ca.17 (1913) monoplane
Caproni Ca.18 (1913) monoplane
Caproni Ca.19
Caproni Ca.20
Caproni Ca.21
Caproni Ca.22 (1914) monoplane
Caproni Ca.23 (1914) monoplane
Caproni Ca.24 (1914) monoplane
Caproni Ca.25 (1914) monoplane
Caproni Ca.30 (Ca.1 - redesignated post-war)
Caproni Ca.31 (Ca.1 - redesignated post-war)
Caproni Ca.32 (Ca.1 / Ca.300 - redesignated post-war)
Caproni Ca.33 (Ca.3 / Ca.450 - redesignated post-war)
Caproni Ca.34 (Ca.3 / Ca.450 - redesignated post-war)
Caproni Ca.35 (Ca.3 / Ca.450 - redesignated post-war)
Caproni Ca.36 (Ca.3 / Ca.450 - redesignated post-war)
Caproni Ca.37
Caproni Ca.38 (Ca.37 derivative)
Caproni Ca.39 (Ca.3 / Ca.450 - seaplane conversion redesignated post-war)
Caproni Ca.40 (Ca.4 - pre-series batch - redesignated post-war)
Caproni Ca.41 (Ca.4 - production aircraft - redesignated post-war)
Caproni Ca.42 (Ca.4 - with 450hp Liberty engines - RNAS))
Caproni Ca.43 (Ca.4 - a Ca4 converted to floatplane - redesignated post-war)
Caproni Ca.44 (Ca.5 / Ca.600 - redesignated post-war)
Caproni Ca.45 (Ca.5 with 250hp IF V.6 engines)
Caproni Ca.46 (Ca.5 with 450hp Liberty engines - Standard, Curtiss and Fisher production)
Caproni Ca.47 (I.ca. - Idrovolante Caproni - redesignated postwar)
Caproni Ca.48 (Ca.4 - airliner version post-war)
Caproni Ca.50 (Ca.5 - redesignated post-war)
Caproni Ca.51 (Ca.4 - biplane tail unit - redesignated post-war)
Caproni Ca.52 (Ca.4 - lower gondola removed - 500kg bomb - redesignated post-war)
Caproni Ca.53
Caproni Ca.56 (Ca.3 post-war airliner conversions)
Caproni Ca.57 (Ca.5 airliner version / conversions
Caproni Ca.58 (Ca.4 - airliner conversions post-war)
Caproni Ca.59 (Ca.4 - 5-engined airliner conversions post-war)
Caproni Ca.60 Transaereo (Ca.4 wings on a triple triplane flying boat hull)
Caproni Ca.61
Caproni Ca.66
Caproni Ca.67
Caproni Ca.70
Caproni Ca.71
Caproni Ca.72
Caproni Ca.73
Caproni Ca.74
Caproni Ca.79
Caproni Ca.80 (Ca.73 with Bristol Jupiter engines)
Caproni Ca.82 (Ca.73ter re-designated)
Caproni Ca.87 Polonia
Caproni Ca.88
Caproni Ca.89
Caproni Ca.90
Caproni Ca.95
Caproni Ca.97
Caproni Ca.100
Caproni Ca.101
Caproni Ca.102
Caproni Ca.103 (Ca.73 derivative)
Caproni Ca.104
Caproni Ca.105 (photo only)
Caproni Ca.107 (un-built)
Caproni Ca.109
Caproni Ca.110 (un-built)
Caproni Ca.111
Caproni Ca.113
Caproni Ca.114
Caproni Ca.120
Caproni Ca.122
Caproni Ca.123
Caproni Ca.124
Caproni Ca.125
Caproni Ca.127
Caproni Ca.131
Caproni Ca.132
Caproni Ca.133
Caproni Ca.134
Caproni Ca.135
Caproni Ca.137
Caproni Ca.140
Caproni Ca.142
Caproni Ca.146
Caproni Ca.148
Caproni Ca.161
Caproni Ca.163 (prototype Ca.164)
Caproni Ca.164
Caproni Ca.165
Caproni Ca.166
Caproni Ca.169
Caproni Ca.183
Caproni Ca.191
Caproni Ca.193
Caproni Ca.225
Caproni Ca.301
Caproni Ca.303
Caproni Ca.305
Caproni Ca.306
Caproni Ca.307
Caproni Ca.308
Caproni Ca.308 Borea
Caproni Ca.309 Ghibli
Caproni Ca.310 Libeccio
Caproni Ca.311
Caproni Ca.312
Caproni Ca.313
Caproni Ca.314
Caproni Ca.316
Caproni Ca.325
Caproni Ca.331
Caproni Ca.335
Caproni Ca.350 Maestrale
Caproni Ca.355
Caproni Ca.405
Caproni Ca.602
Caproni Ca.603
Caproni CH.1
Caproni I.Ca (Idrovolante Caproni / Ca.47)
Caproni-Stipa
Caproni Sauro-1
Caproni Tricap
Caproni-Pensuti 2
Caproni PS.1
Caproni TM.2
Caproni QR.14 Levriero

Caproni-Bergamaschi
(Caproni-Bergamaschi / CAB Cantieri Aeronautici Bergamaschi)
 Caproni A.P.1
 Caproni Bergamaschi PL.3
 Caproni PS.1
 CAB C-1
 CAB C-2
 CAB C-4
 CAB AR-1
 CAB AR-2
 CAB AR-10
 CAB SC-4
 CAB SCA-5
 CAB AP.1

Caproni – Campini 
 Caproni-Campini N.1

Caproni-Predappio
 Caproni-Predappio Ca.602
 Caproni-Predappio Ca.603

Caproni Trento 
(Aeroplane Caproni Trento)
 Caproni Trento F-5

Caproni Vizzola 
(Caproni-Vizzola S.A. – originally Scuola Aviazioni Caproni)
 Caproni-Vizzola CV.3
 Caproni-Vizzola F.4
 Caproni-Vizzola F.5
 Caproni Vizzola F.6
 Caproni Vizzola F.7
 Caproni Vizzola Calif
 Caproni Vizzola Ventura

Carden-Baynes 
 Carden-Baynes Bee
 Carden-Baynes B-3

Cardoen
(Industrias Cardoen LtdA)
 Cardoen CB 206L-III

Caretti 
(D. Caretti)
 Caretti helicopter

Carins 
(Carins Aircraft, Naugatuck, CT)
 Carins Model A
 Carins Model AC6
 Carins Model C2
 Carins Pusher Cabin Monoplane

Cariou 
(Louis Cariou)
 Cariou CL3 Sagittaire

Carley
(Joop D. Carley / Carley Flying School (Vliegvereniging), Ede, 1917)
 Carley 1917 Canard
 Carley S.1 1919
 Carley C.12
 Carley L.II - at NVI 1922 2-seat single-bay biplane trainer
 Carley Baby - at NVI 1922 single-seat shoulder-winged monoplane - aka 'Carly-baby'; aka 'Baby'; aka 'baby-machines'

Carlson 
(Goodwin Carlson, Slayton, MN)
 Carlson Space Saver

Carlson 
((Ernest W) Carlson Aircraft Inc, E Palestine, OH)
 Carlson Sparrow Ultralight
 Carlson Sparrow II
 Carlson Sparrow Sport Special
 Carlson Sparrow II XTC
 Carlson Criquet
 Carlson Skycycle

Carma 
(Carma Manufacturing Co, Tucson, AZ)
 Carma VT-1 Weejet

CARMAM 
(Coopérative d'Approvisionnement et de Réparation de Matériel Aéronautique de Moulins)
 CARMAM 20-90 Impala (Jacquet/Pottier JP20/90 Impala)

Carmier
(Pierre Carmier)
 Carmier Dupouy T.10

Carmier-Arnoux
(Pierre Carmier et René Arnoux)
 Carmier-Arnoux 10hp Simplex
 Carmier-Arnoux Simplex (320 hp)

Carnes 
(Joseph R Carnes, Hillsboro, IN)
 Carnes 1931 home-built

Carothers 
(Dr C E 'Chuck' Carothers, Lincoln, NE)
 Aerobatic Midwing Special

Carpenter 
(Merrell L Carpenter, Joplin, MO and New Orleans, LA)
 Carpenter Special
 Carpenter Little Dea Dea

Carplane GmbH
(Braunschweig, Germany)
Carplane GmbH Carplane

Carr 
(Walter J Carr, Saginaw, MI, 1924: CSC Aircraft Co (Carr, John Coryell, Edward & Walter Savage), Saginaw, MI)
 CSC Maiden Saginaw
 Carr Special aka Junior

Carroll
 Carroll A2 – info required – French World War I observation aircraft competition loser

Carroll 
(Raymond Carroll)
 Carroll 1920 biplane

Carson 
((Franklin) Carson Helicopters Inc, Perkasie, PA)
 Carson Super C-4

Carstedt
(Carstedt Inc., Long Beach, CA)
 Carstedt Jet Liner 600

CarterCopter 
(1994: CarterCopters LLC (pres: Jay Carter Jr), Wichita Falls, TX)
 CarterCopter
 Carter PAV

Carter-Maxwell 
((Don J) Carter-(Arnold B) Maxwell Co, RFD 4, N Kansas City, MO)
 Carter-Maxwell C-M-2

CASA 
(Construcciones Aeronáuticas SA)
 CASA I
 CASA III
 CASA 1.131 Jungmann license-built version of the Bücker Bü 131
 CASA 1.133 Jungmeister license-built version of the Bücker Bü 133
 CASA 2.111 license-built version of the Heinkel 111
 CASA 352 license-built version of the Junkers Ju 52
 CASA C-101 Aviojet
 CASA C-102
 CASA C.127 license-built version of the Dornier Do 27
 CASA C-201 Alcotán
 CASA C-202 Halcón
 CASA C-207 Azor
 CASA C-212 Aviocar
 CASA C-223 Flamingo license-built version of the MBB 223 Flamingo
 CASA/IPTN CN-235
 CASA C-295
 CASA SF-5A; license-built version of the Northrop F-5A
 CASA SF-5B; license-built version of the Northrop F-5B
 CASA SRF-5A; license-built version of the Northrop RF-5A
 CASA 3000; regional airliner – project abandoned in 1994.

Cascade 
(Cascade Ultralites)
 Cascade Kasperwing I-80

Casey Jones 
(JVW Corp, Newark, NJ)
 Casey Jones Flying Boat

Caspar 
(Caspar-Werke)
 Caspar C V
 Caspar U 1
 Caspar U 2
 Caspar F 4
 Caspar S 1
 Caspar S 2
 Caspar CT 1
 Caspar CT 2
 Caspar CT 3
 Caspar CT 4
 Caspar CT 5
 Caspar CLE 11
 Caspar CLE 12
 Caspar CJ 14
 Caspar SJ
 Caspar CS 14
 Caspar CC 15
 Caspar CLE 16
 Caspar C 17
 Caspar CST 18
 Caspar C 23
 Caspar C 24
 Caspar C 26
 Caspar C 27
 Caspar C 29
 Caspar C 30
 Caspar LE 30
 Caspar C 32
 Caspar C 33
 Caspar C 35
 Caspar C 36
 Caspar D.I

Cassutt 
(Designer: Tom Cassutt)
 Cassutt Special
 Cassutt II
 Cassutt III

Castaibert
(Paul (Pablo) Castaibert)
 Castaibert I 1910
 Castaibert II 1911
 Castaibert III 1912
 Castaibert IV 1913 
 Castaibert V 1914
 Castaibert VI 1915
 Castaibert VII 1915

Castel
(Robert Castello)
 Castel Yanapour II
 Castel Casoar
 Castel C-24
 Castel C-24S
 Castel C-242
 Castel C-25S
 Castel C-301S
 Castel C-31P
 Castel C-310P
 Castel C-311P
 Castel C-32
 Castel C-34 Condor
 Castel C-36

Castel-Mauboussin 
 Castel-Mauboussin CM Jalon
 Castel-Mauboussin CM.7
 Castel-Mauboussin CM.71
 Castel-Mauboussin CM.8
 Castel-Mauboussin CM.88
 Castel-Mauboussin CM.10
 Castel-Mauboussin CM.100
 Castel-Mauboussin CM.101

Castiglioni
(Angelo and Alfredo Castiglioni)
 Castiglioni Dragon Fly 333

CAT 
(Construzioni Aeronautiche Taliedo)
 CAT TM.2.
 CAT QR.14

CATA 
(Construction Aeronautique de Technologie Avancee)
 CATA LMK.1 ORYX

CATA
(Compañia Argentina de Trabajos Aéreos)
 CATA (Fleet) 150

Cato 
(Cato Aircraft and Engine Corp)
 Cato 1909 Biplane
 Cato 1910 Monoplane
 Cato 1911 pusher biplane
 Cato Bounds
 Cato-LWF Butterfly
 Cato Sport Plane

Catron & Fisk 
(1917: (J W) Catron & (Edwin) Fisk, 732 Marine St, Venice, CA, 1925: Reorganized as International Aircraft Corp.)
 Catron & Fisk CF-10 Dole racer
 Catron & Fisk CF-11
 Catron & Fisk CF-13
 Catron & Fisk CF-14 Triplane
 Catron & Fisk Sport Triplane
 Catron & Fisk Triplane airliner

Catt 
(Carlos E Catt, Petersburg, IN)
 Catt 1935 monoplane

Caudron 
(Gaston et René Caudron)
 Hydroaéroplane Caudron-Fabre
 Caudron A
 Caudron Airframe
 Caudron B
 Caudron B.2
 Caudron B Multiplace
 Caudron D
 Caudron F
 Caudron G
 Caudron G.2
 Caudron G.3
 Caudron G.4
 Caudron G.5 A3
 Caudron G.6 A2
 Caudron H
 Caudron J
 Caudron J Marine
 Caudron K
 Caudron L
 Caudron M
 Caudron M2
 Caudron N
 Caudron O
 Caudron R
 Caudron R.II (mis-identified R.11!!)
 Caudron R.3
 Caudron R.4
 Caudron R.5
 Caudron R.8 (R.4 Type 8)
 Caudron R.9
 Caudron R.10
 Caudron R.11 A3 spec.
 Caudron R.12
 Caudron R.14
 Caudron R.19 (R.4 Type 19)
 Caudron C.02 (1917 – high altitude fighter)
 Caudron C.17A2
 Caudron C.20
 Caudron C.21
 Caudron C.22
 Caudron C.23
 Caudron C.25
 Caudron C.26
 Caudron C.27
 Caudron C.33
 Caudron C.34
 Caudron C.37
 Caudron C.39
 Caudron C.43
 Caudron C.53
 Caudron C.55
 Caudron C.59
 Caudron C.60
 Caudron C.61
 Caudron C.61bis
 Caudron C.65
 Caudron C.66
 Caudron C.67
 Caudron C.68
 Caudron C.74
 Caudron C.81
 Caudron C.91
 Caudron C.97
 Caudron C.99
 Caudron C.101
 Caudron C.103
 Caudron C.104
 Caudron C.107
 Caudron C.109
 Caudron C.110
 Caudron C.112
 Caudron C.113
 Caudron C.114
 Caudron C.116
 Caudron C.117
 Caudron C.125
 Caudron C.127
 Caudron C.128
 Caudron C.128/2
 Caudron C.140
 Caudron C.157
 Caudron C.159
 Caudron C.161
 Caudron C.168
 Caudron C.180
 Caudron C.183
 Caudron C.190
 Caudron C.191
 Caudron C.192
 Caudron C.193
 Caudron P.V. 200 (designer P. de Viscaya)
 Caudron C.220
 Caudron C.221
 Caudron C.230
 Caudron C.232
 Caudron C.240
 Caudron C.251
 Caudron A.260
 Caudron C.270 Luciole
 Caudron C.271 Luciole
 Caudron C.272 Luciole
 Caudron C.273 Luciole
 Caudron C.274 Luciole
 Caudron C.275 Luciole
 Caudron C.276 Luciole
 Caudron C.277 Luciole
 Caudron C.278 Luciole
 Caudron C.280 Phalene
 Caudron C.282 Super Phalene
 Caudron C.286 Super Phalene
 Caudron C.289 Super Phalene
 Caudron C.340 Micro Phalene
 Caudron C.344 Phalène Junior
 Caudron C.360
 Caudron C.362
 Caudron C.366
 Caudron C.400 Super Phalene
 Caudron C.401 Super Phalene
 Caudron C.410 Super Phalene
 Caudron C.430 Rafale
 Caudron C.430/1
 Caudron C.440 Goéland
 Caudron C.441 Goéland
 Caudron C.444 Goéland
 Caudron C.445 Goéland
 Caudron C.446 Goéland
 Caudron C.447 Goéland
 Caudron C.448 Goéland
 Caudron C.449 Goéland
 Caudron C.450
 Caudron C.460
 Caudron C.461
 Caudron C.480 Frégate
 Caudron C.490
 Caudron C.491
 Caudron C.500 Simoun I
 Caudron C.510 Pélican
 Caudron C.520 Simoun
 Caudron C.530 Rafale
 Caudron C.560
 Caudron C.561
 Caudron C.570 Kangourou
 Caudron C.580
 Caudron C.600 Aiglon
 Caudron C.601 Aiglon
 Caudron C.610 Aiglon
 Caudron C.620 Simoun IV
 Caudron C.630 Simoun
 Caudron C.631 Simoun
 Caudron C.632 Simoun
 Caudron C.634 Simoun
 Caudron C.635 Simoun
 Caudron C.640 Typhon
 Caudron C.641 Typhon
 Caudron C.660 Rafale
 Caudron C.670 Typhon
 Caudron C.680
 Caudron C.684
 Caudron C.685 Super Rafale
 Caudron C.690
 Caudron C.710 Cyclone
 Caudron C.711 Cyclone
 Caudron C.712 Cyclone
 Caudron C.713 Cyclone
 Caudron C.714 Cyclone
 Caudron C.720 Cyclone
 Caudron-Renault CR.760 Cyclone
 Caudron-Renault CR.770 Cyclone
 Caudron C.800
 Caudron C.860
 Caudron C.870
 Caudron C.880
 Caudron KXC
 Caudron Navy Experimental Type C Trainer

Cavalier
(Cavalier Aircraft Corp., Sarasota, FL)
 Executive Mustang
 Cavalier 750
 Cavalier 1200
 Cavalier 1500
 Cavalier 2000
 Cavalier 2500
 Cavalier Mustang II
 Cavalier Turbo Mustang III

Cavarroc 
(Raymond Cavarroc)
 Cavarroc RC.01 Minishinden

Cavasino 
(Victor Cavasino, Bismarck, ND)
 Cavasino A

Cavassilas 
(Pierre Cavassilas)
 Cavassilas CCJ.01
 Cavassilas CCJ.200

Cavenaugh
(Cavenaugh Aviation Inc.)
 Cavenaugh Cargoliner

Caviezel 
 Caviezel Sport 1

CBB
(CBB ULM)
 CBB O2

CCF 
( Canadian Car and Foundry)
 CCF-Burnelli CBY-3
 CCF FDB-1
 CCF F.A.T. 2 Maple Leaf
 CCF SBW Helldiver

References

Further reading

External links

 List of aircraft (C)